PND may refer to:

Medicine
Paroxysmal nocturnal dyspnoea, a breathing disorder
Post-nasal drip, excessive mucus produced by the sinuses
Postnatal depression or postpartum depression, depression after childbirth
Postnatal day
Prenatal diagnosis, testing for diseases or conditions in a fetus or embryo

Politics
New Democracy Party (Portugal) (Partido da Nova Democracia), a political party in Portugal
National Democratic Party (Djibouti) (Parti National Démocratique), a political party in Djibouti
Democratic Nationalist Party (Romania), a dissolved Romanian political party

Transport
Pending LRT station (LRT station abbreviation), Bukit Panjang, Singapore
Punta Gorda Airport (IATA code), Belize

Other uses
"P n D" Pickups and deliveries 
PartyNextDoor, a Canadian recording artist who is signed to Drake's OVO Sound record label
Penalty Notice for Disorder or Fixed Penalty Notice, a fine for anti-social offenses in Britain
Peoria Notre Dame High School, Peoria, Illinois
Personal navigation device or personal navigation assistant, a portable positioning and navigation device
 (Name Authority File)
Pitcairn Islands dollar
Powder neutron diffraction, a crystal structure analysis technique
Philanthropy News Digest (PND), a daily news service of the Foundation Center
Project network diagram, a method of organizing project deliverables
Police National Database, created in 2011 by Logica
Punks not dead is the first studio album by the Scottish punk rock band The Exploited

See also
 PNDS (disambiguation)